The Prime Show with Aiman is an Indonesian television prime time talk show hosted by Aiman Witjaksono that aired on iNews. This program replaced The Prime Show.

References 

Indonesian television news shows
Indonesian-language television shows
2022 Indonesian television series debuts
2020s Indonesian television series
INews original programming